was founded by Nakamura Tempu and is also known as Japanese Yoga. It is a study of the principles of nature and how they can be refined to help us realize the truths of nature and our full potentials.

History
Nakamura Tempu created his Japanese Yoga from a variation of Raja Yoga and Karma Yoga, with an emphasis on the latter, which he learned from his Indian teacher Kaliapa (also spelled Cariapa and Kariappa), who took him to Gorkhe, in eastern Nepal.

Goal and means
The goal of this way of mind and body unification is the free use of our mind and bodies and realize our true nature as human beings. We must be able to use our most fundamental tools (the mind and body) naturally, effectively and in coordination of each other to artistically express ourselves in life. Three elements that are key in this process are:
Training to reveal the nature of positivity.
Reformation of the subconscious.
Regulating and maintaining a balanced condition in the nervous system.

Principles and methods
The teachings recognize four basic principles to unify mind and body (shin shin tōitsu no yondai gensoku):
Use the mind in a positive way (fudōshin resulting in "ki no dashikata" i.e. the projection of life energy).
Examine the self.
Analyze suggestions received from your environment.
Examine your attitude towards others.
Discover the present and let the worrying about the future or the past fall away.
Experience the universal mind.
Use the mind with full concentration.
Concentrate on matters you are familiar with.
Concentrate on matters you wish to accomplish in a hurry.
Concentrate on matters you believe are uninteresting.
Concentrate on matters you believe are of no value.
Use the body naturally.
Train the body gradually, systematically and continuously.

According to the founder, humans need six qualities to express themselves in living.

Known practitioners
 Hiroshi Tada
 Masatomi Ikeda
 Kōichi Tōhei
 Sawai Atsuhiro

See also
Dynamic meditation
Ki Aikido

References 

Davey, H. E., (2013) The Teachings of Tempu: Practical Meditation for Daily Life, Michi Publishing, Albany CA, USA  

Sawai, Atsuhiro (2014) The True Paths to Meditation, Michi Publishing, Albany, CA, USA

External links

 Nakamura Tempu Foundation translation
International Japanese Yoga Association
Michi Publishing (English-language books on Nakamura Tempu's Shin-shin-toitsu-do)

Traditional Japanese medicine
Modern Denominational Yoga